Mazar (also Romanized as Mazār; also known as Bezād) is a village in Dehsard Rural District, in the Central District of Arzuiyeh County, Kerman Province, Iran. At the 2006 census, its population was 131, in 32 families.

References 

Populated places in Arzuiyeh County